is a Japanese actor and voice actor from Tokyo. He is currently attached to 81 Produce. He is best known for his roles in Mobile Fighter G Gundam (as Argo Gulskii), the TV Tokyo edition of Teenage Mutant Ninja Turtles (as Donatello), the 2005 Doraemon series (as Kannari-san), and the Yakuza video game series (as Goro Majima).

Filmography

Television animation 
Mobile Fighter G Gundam (1994) – Argo Gulskii, subordinate #B, thief #A
Digimon Adventure (1999) – Nanomon
Initial D: Second Stage (1999) – Papa
Crush Gear Turbo (2001) – Ming Wu
Digimon Frontier (2002) – Wizardmon
Rockman EXE (2002) – Bomberman
Rockman EXE Stream (2005) – Bomberman
Doraemon (2005 series) – Kannari-san
Aikatsu! (2012) – Miteru Itsumo
JoJo's Bizarre Adventure: Stardust Crusaders (2015) – Khan, Chaka's father
Kochoki: Wakaki Nobunaga (2019) – Shibata Katsuie
Boruto: Naruto Next Generations (2019) – Gatai
Shenmue (2022) – Chen Yao Wen
The Human Crazy University (2022) – Professor
The Aristocrat's Otherworldly Adventure: Serving Gods Who Go Too Far (2023) – King

Unknown date 
Keroro Gunsō – Sanematsu
Naruto – Fūjn
Naruto Shippuden – Jinin Akebino
One Piece – Yama
Papuwa – Isami Kondou
Pocket Monsters – Oji-san, Kaneyo's servant
Pocket Monsters Advanced Generation – Donfan, Ogata
Regalia: The Three Sacred Stars – Theodore Moore
Soreike! Anpanman – Dojō-chichi, Shōyu-kun
Gintama – Hachirou

ONA 
Lost Song (2018) – King of Golt (eps. 2, 8, 11), Army Corps Chief (ep. 3)
Tekken: Bloodline (2022) – Ganryu
Cyberpunk: Edgerunners (2022) – Principal

OVA 
Crows (1994) – Harumichi Bōya
JoJo's Bizarre Adventure (xxxx) – Pilot B
Kikaider 01: The Animation (xxxx) – Red Hakaider
La Blue Girl (1994) – Danjo Matsunaga
Melty Lancer: The Animation (xxxx) – I
Mobile Suit Gundam SEED Astray (xxxx) – Reed Wheeler
Mutant Turtles: Superman Legend (1996) – Donatello
Street Fighter Zero (1999) – Zangief

Theatrical animation 
Evangelion New Theatrical Version: Beginning (xxxx) – Soldier
Pocket Monsters: Mewtwo Strikes Back (1998) – Researcher #A
Tekken: Blood Vengeance (2011) – Ganryu
Crayon Shin-chan: The Storm Called: The Battle of the Warring States (2002) – Gonbe Sakuma
Tokyo Godfathers (2003) – Additional voices

Video games 

Orphen: Scion of Sorcery (2000) – Rufus
Tekken 5 (2004) – Ganryu
Atelier Iris 2: The Azoth of Destiny – Galahad
Tekken 6 (2007) – Ganryu
Ryū ga Gotoku Kenzan! (2008) – Majima Gorohachi/Shishido Baiken
Yakuza: Dead Souls (2011) – Goro Majima
Tekken Tag Tournament 2 (2011) – Ganryu
Everybody's Golf 6 (2011) – Max
Tekken 3D: Prime Edition (2012) – Ganryu
Ryū ga Gotoku Ishin! (2014) – Okita Sōji
Hokuto ga Gotoku (2018) – Jagi
Tekken 7 (2019) – Ganryu

Tokusatsu 
B-Fighter Kabuto (1996) – Leaping Fist Beast Gangaroo (ep. 10), Rightful Warrior Beast Driceraija (ep. 26 - 27)
Denji Sentai Megaranger (1997) – Stingray Nejire (ep. 2)
Seijuu Sentai Gingaman (1998) – Rigurou (ep. 3)
Hyakujuu Sentai GaoRanger (2001) – Boat Org (ep. 7)
Ninpuu Sentai Hurricaneger (2003) – Gravity Ninja Omo-Karu (ep. 27)
Bakuryu Sentai Abaranger (2003–2004) – Visionary Messenger Voffa (eps. 1 - 48)/DezumoVoorla (Voice of Masaharu Sato and Bunkou Ogata) (ep. 48)
Bakuryū Sentai Abaranger DELUXE: Abare Summer is Freezing Cold! (2003) – Visionary Messenger Voffa
Bakuryū Sentai Abaranger vs. Hurricaneger (2004) – Visionary Messenger Voffa
Engine Sentai Go-onger vs. Gekiranger (2009) – Confrontation Beast Tortoise-Fist Meka
Samurai Sentai Shinkenger (2009) – Ayakashi Okakurage (ep. 10)
Tensou Sentai Goseiger (2010) – Brasca Alien Mizogu of the Clump (ep. 1)
Ultraman X (2015) (Mold Spectre (ep. 13 - 14) /Guar Spectre (Voice of Minami Tsukui) (ep. 14)
Kamen Rider Ghost (2015) – Yamaarashi-Roid (ep. 24)
Ultra Fight Orb (2017) – Reibatos
Kaitou Sentai Lupinranger VS Keisatsu Sentai Patranger (2018) – Merg Arita (ep. 7)

Dubbing roles

Live-action
Back to the Future Part III (2018 BS Japan edition) – Zeke (Harry Carey Jr.)
Death on the Nile – Monsieur Blondin (Rick Warden)
ER – Fritz (tenth season), Otto (twelfth season), Fred (thirteenth season)
The Little Things – LASD Captain Carl Farris (Terry Kinney)
The Magnificent Seven – Gavin David (Ritchie Montgomery)
Mighty Morphin Power Rangers – Lokar
Teenage Mutant Ninja Turtles III – Donatello

Animation
Bob the Builder – Roley
Class of 3000 – Principal Luna
Gravity Falls – Stanford Pines
Motorcity – Jacob
Teenage Mutant Ninja Turtles (1987 TV series) (TV Tokyo edition) – Donatello
Teenage Mutant Ninja Turtles (2003 TV series) – Shredder
Teenage Mutant Ninja Turtles (2012 TV series) – '87 Donatello
Teen Titans – Slade
The Ant Bully – Glow Worm
Thomas & Friends – Captain (Misty Island Rescue DVD onwards, replacing Kentarō Hayami)

References

External links 
Official agency profile 

1963 births
Living people
Japanese male stage actors
Japanese male video game actors
Japanese male voice actors
Male voice actors from Tokyo
20th-century Japanese male actors
21st-century Japanese male actors
81 Produce voice actors